Wichlinghofen is a Stadtteil (Quarter) in the south of the city of Dortmund, in Germany. With its 3,500 inhabitants it is like a separate village in the city.

Dortmund